Dora's Dunking Doughnuts is a 1933 American short subject directed by Harry Edwards.

Plot summary 
Teacher Andy is fixated on both Dora who runs a bakery and her doughnuts that he has every morning on his way to teach school.  He proposes using the musical talent of his students to perform on a radio show to advertise the bakery.  Once on the air bickering mothers of the students fight and brawl with the manager leading listeners to believe the show is a comedy.

Cast 
Andy Clyde as Andy
Ethel Sykes as Dora
Shirley Temple as Shirley
Bud Jamison as Radio station manager
Fern Emmett as Woman at radio station
Florence Gill as Singer on radio program

External links 

1933 films
1933 comedy films
Educational Pictures short films
American black-and-white films
American comedy short films
Films directed by Harry Edwards (director)
1930s English-language films
1930s American films
1933 short films